Leonard Bernard Schreck was an American football player and coach.

Early life and education
He was born in 1907. Prior to coaching, he was a member of the Cornell University varsity football team for two years as well as the freshmen football team, lacrosse team, and boxing team. He graduated from Cornell with an A.B. degree and in 1930, received his M.E. degree.

Coaching career
Schreck was the first head football coach at Ithaca College in Ithaca, New York.  He held that position for the 1930 season.  His coaching record at Ithaca was 1–3–1.

In 1931, he was appointed assistant varsity football couch at Union College.

References

Year of birth missing
Year of death missing
Cornell Big Red football players
Ithaca Bombers football coaches
Union Dutchmen football coaches